"Since I Lost My Baby" is a 1965 hit single recorded by The Temptations for the Motown Records' Gordy label. Written by Miracles members Smokey Robinson and Pete Moore and produced by Robinson, the song was a top 20 pop single on the Billboard Hot 100 in the United States, on which it peaked at number 17. On Billboard's R&B singles chart, "Since I Lost My Baby" peaked at number four.

Background
Longing and melancholy, "Since I Lost My Baby" tells a story about the pain of losing a lover. Temptations lead singer David Ruffin, portrays the song's narrator, bass singer Melvin Franklin is also heard out front after each of Ruffin's first two lines on the first verse. It was Ruffin's third straight lead on a Temptations single.

Cash Box described it as a "tender, slow-shufflin’ pop-r&b tearjerker about a lad who has been singing the blues since his romance went kaput."

Personnel

 Lead vocals by David Ruffin and Melvin Franklin
 Background vocals by Eddie Kendricks, Melvin Franklin, Paul Williams, and Otis Williams
 Instrumentation by The Funk Brothers and the Detroit Symphony Orchestra.

Charts
The Temptations

Luther Vandross cover

Luther Vandross covered the song for his 1982 album Forever, for Always, for Love. In 1983, Vandross' cover was a top twenty R&B hit, peaking to #17 on Billboards Hot R&B Singles chart.

Charts

References

 Williams, Otis and Romanowski, Patricia (1988, updated 2002). Temptations. Lanham, MD: Cooper Square. .
 Williams, Otis and Weigner, Harry (2002). My Girl: The Very Best of the Temptations (Compact disc liner notes). New York: Motown/Universal Records.

External links 
 List of cover versions of "Since I Lost My Baby" at SecondHandSongs.com

1965 singles
Luther Vandross songs
Song recordings produced by George Martin
The Temptations songs
Songs written by Smokey Robinson
Songs written by Warren "Pete" Moore
Song recordings produced by Smokey Robinson
Gordy Records singles
1965 songs
Epic Records singles